Over the course of his racing career, Kyle Busch has won a combined 226 NASCAR races across NASCAR's top three Series. Busch currently has 61 NASCAR Cup Series wins and holds the all-time wins record in the Xfinity Series (102) and Truck Series (63). He is only the third driver in NASCAR history to win at least 100 races in a single series.

After his win in the 2023 Pala Casino 400, his first Cup Series win of that season, Busch broke a tie with Richard Petty for having the all-time most consecutive Cup Series seasons with a win. (He has won at least 1 Cup Series race each year since 2005.) Petty won at least 1 Cup Series race for 18 seasons in a row (from 1960 to 1977) and 2023 was the 19th consecutive year in which Busch won a Cup Series race.

NASCAR

Cup Series
In the NASCAR Cup Series, Busch earned 2005 Rookie of the Year honors and won the 2015 and 2019 series championships. In 2018, Busch won the Coca-Cola 600 at Charlotte Motor Speedway, making him the first driver in the modern era to win at all active tracks in which the series competed (23 at the time). Since then, new tracks have been added to the Cup schedule.

Xfinity Series
In the Xfinity Series, Busch, the 2004 Rookie of the Year and 2009 series champion, has won 102 races, ranking him first for all-time series wins. Busch has won at 28 different tracks in the series.

Truck Series
In the Craftsman Truck Series, Busch has won 63 races, ranking him first on the all-time wins list. He has won at 20 different tracks in the series.

Camping World East Series
In the Camping World East Series, Busch has won once in his only series start.

See also
 List of all-time NASCAR Cup Series winners

References

Career achievements of racing drivers
NASCAR-related lists
NASCAR race wins